Richard Bordewick (18 April 1939 – 15 May 2007) was a Canadian rower. He competed in the men's eight event at the 1964 Summer Olympics.

References

1939 births
2007 deaths
Canadian male rowers
Olympic rowers of Canada
Rowers at the 1964 Summer Olympics
Place of birth missing